The City of Cockburn in Perth, Western Australia was originally established on 12 February 1871 as the Fremantle Road Board with a chairman and councillors under the District Roads Act 1871. It was renamed Cockburn on 21 January 1955, and with the passage of the Local Government Act 1960, all road boards became Shires with a shire president and councillors effective 1 July 1961. The Shire of Cockburn was declared a town on 24 January 1971, at which point the president became a mayor. Cockburn attained city status on 26 October 1979.

Chairmen 

 John Willis died on 19 September 1944. Andrew Bailey was elected by the other councillors to fill the remainder of his term, which expired on 21 April 1945.

Mayors

References

Lists of local government leaders in Western Australia
City of Cockburn